The Reformation, also known as the Protestant Reformation, was the 16th century schism within Western Christianity initiated by Martin Luther, John Calvin, and others

Reformation may also refer to:

Religious movements
Movements connected to the Protestant Reformation:
English Reformation, series of events in 16th century England by which the church in England broke away from the authority of the Pope and the Roman Catholic Church 
Icelandic Reformation, King Christian III of Denmark's imposition of Lutheranism, in the middle of the 16th century
Reformation in Denmark–Norway and Holstein, the 16th century transition to Lutheranism in the realms ruled by the Copenhagen-based House of Oldenburg
Reformation in Switzerland, the Protestant Reformation in Switzerland, during the 1520s
Scottish Reformation, part of the wider Protestant Reformation, in 1560
Swedish Reformation, the Protestant reformation in Sweden, in 1527
Radical Reformation, an Anabaptist movement concurrent with the Magisterial Protestant Reformation
Counter-Reformation (also known as the Catholic Reformation), the period of Catholic revival beginning with the Council of Trent, in response to the Protestant Reformation
Evening Light Reformation, part of the holiness movement that led to the formation of the Church of God (Anderson, Indiana)
Liberalism and progressivism within Islam (also known as Islamic Reformation), a variety of movements to reform Islam in the 20th and 21st centuries
Mormon Reformation, a movement in Utah Territory in 1856–57

Arts, entertainment, and media

Literature
The Reformation, the sixth volume of The Story of Civilization by Will and Ariel Durant, focusing on the Protestant Reformation
The Reformation: A History, by English historian Diarmaid MacCulloch

Music
Reformation (Kiuas album), 2006
Reformation (Spandau Ballet album), 2002
Symphony No. 5 (Mendelssohn), also called the Reformation Symphony, commemorating the Protestant Reformation
Zach Williams & The Reformation, a Southern rock band from Arkansas

Other uses in arts, entertainment, and media
 Reformation (2015 film), a melodramatic neo-noir, directed by Hoyon Jung
Reformation (journal), a peer-reviewed academic journal sponsored by the Tyndale Society, publishing scholarship relating to the Reformation era
"Reformation" (The Wire), a 2004 episode of the television series The Wire

Other uses
Bohemian Reformation (also known as the Czech Reformation or Hussite Reformation)
Reformation, a term commonly used in the United States for the Rectification (law) of a written contract or legal instrument
Post-Suharto era or period of Reformasi (Reform), the (current) era in Indonesia following the 1997 Asian financial crisis and the fall of Suharto, characterized by increased freedom and political participation
Reformation of hydrocarbons in chemistry, see Catalytic reforming

See also
Reconstruction (disambiguation)
Reform (disambiguation)
Reformasi (disambiguation)
Reformation Day, a religious holiday celebrated on October 31 in remembrance of the Protestant Reformation
Reformation Wall, a monument to the Protestant Reformation in Geneva, Switzerland